RYNA were a rock band from Manchester, England, consisting of four members - Caroline Sterling, Anthony Grantham (previously of the Britpop band Marion), Alexander Redhead and Pete Gray. Grantham and Redhead also featured in an earlier Manchester band, Chalk, which also included members Patrick Briscoe and Andrew Woollard.

Television performances
RYNA appeared on the Manchester-based TV channel, Channel M, performing live.

References

External links

Musical groups from Manchester
2005 establishments in England
2007 disestablishments in England
Musical groups established in 2005
Musical groups disestablished in 2007
English rock music groups